Pithecellobium seleri is a species of plant in the family Fabaceae. It is found in Guatemala and Honduras.

References

seleri
Flora of Guatemala
Flora of Honduras
Endangered plants
Taxonomy articles created by Polbot
Taxobox binomials not recognized by IUCN